A train is a form of rail transport comprising a series of connected vehicles that usually run along a rail track to transport cargo or passengers.

Train(s) may also refer to:

Places
 Train, Bavaria, a town in Bavaria, Germany

People
 Train (surname)
 Matt Bloom (born 1972), American professional wrestler sometimes known as A-Train
 Ice Train (wrestler) (born 1967), Harold Hogue, former American professional wrestler

Transport 
 Train (roller coaster), the specialized vehicle which transports riders around a roller coaster track
 Camel train, a series of camels carrying goods or passengers in a group
 Overland train, a type of oversized semi-trailer truck that could travel over most terrain
 Road train, a truck design used in remote areas of Australia to move bulky loads efficiently
 Trackless train, a road-going articulated vehicle
 Wagon train, a group of wagons traveling together, especially the American West

Organizations
 TRAIN, or The Redstone Acceleration & Innovation Network, an organization
 TRAIN, or Tourist Railway Association, Inc., an organization dedicated to promoting the tourist railway industry in the United States

Science and technology 
 Train (unidentified sound), one of six unidentified sounds recorded by the U.S. National Oceanic and Atmospheric Administration
 Gear train, an interconnected series of gears in a machine
 Wheel train (horology), the gear train of a mechanical watch or clock
 LNG train, a natural gas liquefaction unit
 Print train, on a train printer
 Software release train, a concept in software engineering
 Wave train, a finite burst of wave action that travels as a unit

Arts, entertainment, and media

Games
 Train, a board game by Brenda Romero
 Trainz, a railroad-operations simulation video game

Music

Groups
 Train (band), an American rock band

Albums
 Train (album), their debut album

Opera 

 "Train", scene 1 from the first act of Einstein on the Beach, composed by Philip Glass

Songs
 "Train" (3 Doors Down song), 2008
 "Train" (Goldfrapp song), 2003
 "Train", by 4 Non Blondes from Bigger, Better, Faster, More!, 1992
 "Train", by the Bats from Couchmaster, 1995
 "Train", by Ketsumeishi, 2007
 "Train", by Nitro Nitra, representing Delaware in the American Song Contest, 2022
 "Train", by P-Model from Perspective, 1992
 "Train", by Red Box from Motive, 1990
 "Train", by Uncle Tupelo from No Depression, 1990
 "Trains", by Nav from Emergency Tsunami, 2020
 "Trains", by Porcupine Tree from In Absentia, 2002
 "Trains", by the Vapors from New Clear Days, 1980

Other arts, entertainment, and media 
 Train (film), a 2008 American horror film
 Trains (magazine), a magazine devoted to trains and railroads
 Train Heartnet, a fictional character in the anime series Black Cat
 "Trains", a monologue by Reginald Gardiner
 Train (TV series), a 2020 South Korean television series

Legislation
Tax Reform for Acceleration and Inclusion Law (TRAIN Law), a legislation which made reforms on taxation in the Philippines
 Transparency in Regulatory Analysis of Impacts on the Nation Act (TRAIN Act), U.S. House legislation sponsored by John Sullivan

Other uses 
 Train (clothing), the long back portion of a skirt or dress that trails on the ground behind the wearer
 Train (military), the supply and support units of an army
 Train, the male peafowl's elongated upper tail covert feathers as used in display
Train, or to "run a train", the process of multiple men having sexual intercourse with a single female, with little to no breaks between "sessions"; this is often a form of gang rape

See also 
 Powertrain, the components that generate and deliver power for a vehicle
 Soul Train
 The Train (disambiguation)
 Train Train (disambiguation)
 Training, the acquisition of useful knowledge and skills through instruction
 Trane (disambiguation)